Charles William Maynes (December 9, 1938 – June 2, 2007) was a United States diplomat and long-time editor of Foreign Policy magazine.

Biography

Charles W. Maynes was born in Huron, South Dakota, on December 9, 1938. He was educated at Harvard College, receiving a bachelor's degree in history in 1960. He was then awarded a Rhodes Scholarship and studied at Merton College, Oxford, receiving a master's degree in politics, philosophy, and economics in 1962. Maynes was fluent in French and Russian.

Maynes joined the United States Foreign Service after graduating from Oxford. Over the next nine years, he served as a Foreign Service Officer in Laos and the Soviet Union. In 1972, he left the foreign service to join the staff of Sargent Shriver, the running mate of Democratic candidate George McGovern in the 1972 presidential election. In the early 1970s, he also served on the staffs of Sen. Fred R. Harris (D—OK) and Rep. Frank B. Morse (D—MA-5). From 1972 through 1977, Maynes was secretary of the Carnegie Endowment for International Peace.

In 1977, President of the United States Jimmy Carter nominated Maynes as Assistant Secretary of State for International Organization Affairs and, after Senate confirmation, Maynes held this office from April 14, 1977, until April 9, 1980. During his time in office, Maynes helped draft agreements that led to the independence of Namibia from South Africa. He also oversaw U.S. efforts related to the United Nations Interim Force in Lebanon.

Leaving government service in 1980, Maynes became editor of Foreign Policy magazine, a position he would hold until 1997.

From 1997 through 2007, Maynes was president of the Eurasia Foundation.

Mayne died of cancer at his home in Chevy Chase, Maryland, on June 2, 2007.

References

Matt Schudel, "Charles W. Maynes, 68; Foreign Policy Expert at State Department", Washington Post, June 7, 2007
Interview with Ambassador Charles William Maynes (1998)

1938 births
United States Assistant Secretaries of State
People from Huron, South Dakota
Harvard College alumni
Alumni of Merton College, Oxford
American Rhodes Scholars
2007 deaths
People from Chevy Chase, Maryland